Whose Zoo? is a 1918 American comedy film featuring Stan Laurel.

Cast
 Kathleen O'Connor - Katherine
 Rube Miller - Rube
 Stan Laurel - Stanley

See also
 List of American films of 1918

External links

1918 films
American black-and-white films
1918 comedy films
Films directed by Craig Hutchinson
American silent short films
1918 short films
American comedy short films
1910s American films
Silent American comedy films